Beebo is a rural locality in the Goondiwindi Region, Queensland, Australia. It is on the border between Queensland and New South Wales.

Geography 
Beebo is bounded to the south-west by the Dumaresq River, the border between Queensland and New South Wales.

Magee is a neighbourhood in the locality around the now-abandoned Magee railway station on the former Texas branch railway line.

The north-west of the locality is within the Yelarbon State Forest which extends into Glenarbon to the north and west and into Brush Creek to the north-east.

History 
Beebo was opened for selection on 17 April 1877;  were available.

The Beebo Provisional School opened on 4 November 1901 and became Beebo State School on 1 January 1909. The school closed on several occasions due to low student numbers, finally closing on 25 September 1964.

The Texas branch railway line from Inglewood to Texas opened on 3 November 1930 with Beebo being served by the Magee railway station. The name Magee comes from Magee Creek, which was named after a stockman.

Glenarbon Provisional School opened on 17 March 1933, becoming Glenarbon State School in 1940. It closed in 1982. The school was located just to the south of the Texas Yelarbon Road at  within the present-day boundaries of Beebo. The site is now a recreational reserve operated by the Goondiwindi Regional Council.

St Paul's Lutheran Church was established circa December 1959.

Amenities 
The former Glenarbon State School is now a recreational reserve operated by the Goondiwindi Regional Council.

It has a small cemetery.

There is a public hall on the Texas Yelarbon Road.

Education 
There are no schools in Beebo. The nearest primary schools are Inglewood State School in Inglewood to the north, Texas State School in Texas to the south-east, and Yelarbon State School in Yelarbon to the west. The nearest secondary schools are  Inglewood State School (to Year 10) in Inglewood and Texas State School (for Year 10) in Texas. For nearest school with secondary schooling to Year 12 is Goondiwindi State High School in Goondiwindi to the west, but it is so distant that other options would be distance education or boarding school.

References

Further reading

External links

Goondiwindi Region
Localities in Queensland